CCI may refer to:

Companies
Coca-Cola İçecek, one of the largest Coca-Cola bottlers in the world
Castleton Commodities International, a global commodities trading firm headquartered in Stamford, Connecticut
CCI (ammunition), known as CCI/Speer or Speer/CCI, a manufacturer of rimfire ammunition, centerfire handgun ammunition, and primers
CCI Europe, a Danish software company
Cement Corporation of India, Indian Government Owned Corporation
Cinema City International, which operates cinemas in Israel and Europe
Cleveland-Cliffs, an Iron mining company
Compal Communications, Inc, a manufacturer of mobile phones
Computer Consoles Inc., a former telephony and computer company located in Rochester, New York
Concurrent Controls, Inc., a former developer of Concurrent DOS and Multiuser DOS
Consolidated Communications, an American telecommunications company
Custom Coasters International, a manufacturer of wooden roller coasters
Crown Castle

Institutions and organizations
Canadian Condominium Institute
Canadian Conservation Institute, a Canadian government conservation agency
Canine Companions for Independence
Center for Citizen Initiatives
Center for Computational Innovations, supercomputing centre at the Rensselaer Polytechnic Institute, USA
Center for Copyright Information
Center for Creative Imaging
Chinese Culinary Institute, a cooking school in Hong Kong
Classic College International
Co-Counselling International
Competition Commission of India
Council of Common Interests, Pakistan
Cross Cancer Institute, the comprehensive cancer centre for northern Alberta, Canada
Iowa Citizens for Community Improvement, a non-profit activist organization based in Des Moines, Iowa
MIT Center for Collective Intelligence

Prisons
California Correctional Institution, state prison in California, United States
Chillicothe Correctional Institution, a state prison in Ohio, United States
Columbia Correctional Institution, a state prison in Wisconsin, United States
Columbus Correctional Institution, a prison in North Carolina, United States

Sports
CCI Phantom, a pump action paintball marker
Collegiate Championship Invitational, an American rugby sevens tournament
Concours Complet International, the competition rating for the equestrian sport of eventing
Cricket Club of India, in Mumbai

Technology
Cache Coherent Interconnect, a feature of ARM big.LITTLE processors
 Clustered columnstore index, a type of database table introduced in SQL Server 2012
Co-channel interference, a problem in radio communications
Coded-Call Indicator, used to display telephone numbers in the (obsolete) Director telephone system
Command Control Interface, a Hitachi software
Communication-Centric Intelligence Satellite (CCI-Sat), an Indian spy satellite under development
Common Client Interface, part of the Java EE Connector Architecture
Controlled Cryptographic Item
Copy Control Information
The first type of Current conveyor, an electronic ideal concept as well as practical device

Other
201, in Roman numerals
 IATA identifier "CCI" for Capital Cargo International Airlines
Charlson Comorbidity Index
Citizens Commission of Inquiry into war crimes in Vietnam
San Diego Comic-Con also known as Comic-Con International, a comics and entertainment convention held annually in San Diego
Comic Con India, Indian comic con
Commodity Channel Index
Consumer Confidence Index
Craniocervical instability, a medical condition where there is excessive movement between the skull and the top two vertebrae
Cultural and Creative Industries